Blue Startups is a Hawaii-based accelerator company co-founded by Henk Rogers, Maya Rogers and Chenoa Farnsworth in 2012. They created it to help startup companies, and help make Hawaii more identifiable as a technological business hub. The company has a network of over 120 mentors from the Hawaii, Silicon Valley, and Asia areas. The company's stated goal - according to former Program Manager Meli James - is to get companies started in Hawaii and make them want to keep working in the state.

The accelerator participates in and operates a number of events. Its most notable event is its cohort program, where the accelerator offers startup companies the opportunity to receive capital, training, and experience to grow their startup. The cohort program takes place once a year, with programs that focus on developing "capital-efficient and scalable-technology companies" in the Internet, software, mobile, gaming, and e-commerce industries. Startups are selected from hundreds of applicants receive an initial investment of $25,000, training, and office space in exchange for a 3% to 10% equity stake. Blue Startups is able to invest up to $300,000 in each startup. The company has hosted fourteen cohorts as of December 2022, and it has over 100 companies in its portfolio.

The company has been met with good recognition for its involvement in assisting with startups and its participation in improving the Hawaiian technological scene. It appeared at number 17 on a list of the "top 20 US accelerators" and was cited as an example of companies that are "mentoring an expanding network of Internet, software, mobile, and e-commerce firms."

History

Henk, Maya Rogers and Chenoa Farnsworth co-founded Blue Startups on September 1, 2012 to provide tools and assistance to help companies and the Hawaiian business industry. As of 2015, Maya Rogers is in charge of business development. In 2013, Chenoa Farnsworths is the accelerators Managing Partner. Blue Startups has a network of over 120 mentors from Hawaii, the Silicon Valley, and Asia. All participating companies of the cohort program have access to this extended network. The company describes itself as being a "stepping stone" for entrepreneurs in Asia and the Silicon Valley areas who want to get into each other's markets.

As of August 2018, Blue Startups has eight lead mentors. These lead mentors include Robert Robinson, Steve Markowitz, Matt Johnston, Matt Miller, Joey Katzen, Paulette Jencks, Steve Pearman and Eric Bjorndahl. The company has a network of over 120 mentors from the Hawaii, Silicon Valley, and Asia areas including Don Dodge, Don Kosak, Eric Nakagawa, Faruq Ahmad, Marvin Liao, Peter Kay, Rob Bertholf, Steve Sue, Steven Baker, Tina Fitch and more. Henk Rogers has assisted in the video game industry, particularly with respect to the puzzle video game Tetris. Robinson participated on a panel of judges as part of the Entrepreneurs Foundation of Hawaii on March 24, 2015. In this event, he and other judges are tasked with judging five-minute pitches to them. Blue Startups hosted a "digital lifestyle conference" from November 6–7, 2014, which was done to allow investors from Silicon Valley and Asia to "meet for deal making, learning and networking." The company took part in the 15th annual holiday tech fair, which was hosted at the Japanese Cultural Center in Honolulu by the High Technology Development Corporation on December 29, 2014.

Blue Startups was given $200,000 in Hawaiian taxpayer money at first, and later had taken in an approximate total of $1.7 million. The state of Hawaii requires matching funds, so Blue Startups has received approximately the same amount in private investments. The tax funding was given to Blue Startups as well as two other Hawaii-based startups by the Hawaii Strategic Development Corp.'s Launch Akamai Venture Accelerator program.

Cohort program

Blue Startups runs an annual cohort program which focuses on developing "capital-efficient and scalable-technology companies." These companies vary between Internet, software, mobile, gaming, and e-commerce companies. The majority of the three-month-long program offered by Blue Startups takes place in Hawaii, on the island of Oahu, with a one-week follow-up in Silicon Valley, California. The mentoring cohorts occur twice per year, with up to 10 companies accepted into each session. Each company that participates in a cohort receives a seed investment, office space, a 3-month program consisting of entrepreneurial training, and more. Each participating company receives an initial investment of $25,000. The companies are each assigned personal mentors and meet at least once a week. In return, Blue Startups retains a 3% to 10% equity stake in each company. For a company to apply for a Blue Startups cohort, they must have two to four founders, with most of the team willing to live in Hawaii during the program. All companies must be incorporated as a C corp to be eligible. Teams are expected to work in the Blue Startups' space in downtown Honolulu for a minimum of five hours a day during the length of the cohort.

Blue Startups received over 100 applications and selected seven companies to participate in its first cohort. The second session received more than 200 applications and seven were chosen to participate in the 13-week program. On January January 6, 2014, the company announced that it was seeking applicants for its third cohort. Applications were accepted from January 6 to February 1, 2014, and the event took place on from March 17 to June 6, 2014. It was announced on April 2, 2014 that the candidates for the third cohort of startups had been chosen. Another demo even was hosted by Blue Startups in conjunction with Energy Excelerator called "Startup Paradise Demo Day." It was scheduled on June 13, 2014, and it was hosted at Iolani School's Seto Hall and Sullivan Center for Innovation and Leadership. By the end of the third cohort in October 2014, the 23 graduating companies raised over $6 million of follow-on investments from private investors. Blue Startups announced its fourth cohort of startups on July 22, 2014. It hosted an informational session for interested parties on July 29, 2014, and set a cut-off date of August 15, 2014. This particular event had Blue Startups seeking companies that have a "health care technology focus." Despite the deadline passing, Blue Startups allowed companies to continue submitting applications for the event. The event was a collaboration between the company and Hawaii's online health insurance exchange Hawaii Health Sector. The company held this fourth cohort during the Fall of 2014, where the company chose ten companies to participate. Applications for the company's fifth cohort event in Spring of 2015 began on December 1, 2014. During the company's Spring 2015 cohort event, it selected eight applicants out of a group of 300. The Spring 2015 program was designed with a focus on travel-based technology. The company that is selected by Blue Startups during the Spring event will be given mentorship by Michael Troy, who works in the tourism industry. Blue Startups' portfolio includes 36 investments. A total of five cohort selections have been completed as of March 2015. Below is a list of portfolio companies:

As of August 20, 2018, Blue Startups has 76 companies in its portfolio and has awarded these companies with $2,000,000 in "seed and additional capital."

Recognition

Tech Crunch listed Blue Startups as the 17th best startup accelerator in 2015.  Blue Startups appeared on a list of the top 20 "America's top tech accelerators" by The Seed Accelerator Rankings Project, and was selected by Yael Hochberg, Susan Cohen, and Dan Fehder. The company ranked at number 17. It was selected among "150 accelerators, fixed-term, cohort-based programs." An editor for CNNMoney named Hawaii one of the top 10 most entrepreneurial states. In this article, the author cited companies like Blue Startups as an example of companies who are "mentoring an expanding network of Internet, software, mobile, and e-commerce firms." The company's services are valued at more than $500,000. Pacific Business News editor Stephanie Silverstein noted that while two other startup companies were having difficulties with money and management, Blue Startups was "off to a strong start." Brandon Bennett, CEO of Happy Hour Pal (one of the companies accepted into Blue Startups through its cohort program), praised Blue Startups for being accommodating to his company and noted that the business atmosphere between him and other startup owners was good. Sagely, one of the companies from Blue Startups' fourth cohort, stated that "the opportunities offered by Blue Startups would be impossible to do on your own." Blue Startups' first three cohorts, as of July 22, 2014, have managed to raise more than $6 million in investment capital. Business owner Arben Kryeziu seemed to have an "adamant" desire to fund companies that came out of Blue Startups' cohort programs, as noted by author Evan Nagle. Kryeziu noted that his business, which is similar to Blue Startups, will exist in the area to add to the Hawaiian startup efforts rather than compete in it.

See also

 Business incubator
 Seed accelerator

References

External links
 Official website for Blue Startups

American companies established in 2012
Startup accelerators
Companies based in Honolulu